is a Japanese manga series written and illustrated by Nobuyuki Fukumoto. It was published in Shogakukan's seinen manga magazine Big Comic Original from 2002 to 2006. It was followed by a sequel Shin Kurosawa:Saikyō Densetsu, which ran in the same magazine from 2013 to 2020. A spin-off focused on the first series' secondary character Shūhei Nakane, titled Saitsuyo Densetsu Nakane, was serialized on Yawaraka Spirits website from 2017 to 2020.

Plot
The story depicts the sorrow and hardships of Kurosawa, a 44-year-old construction worker. In December 2002, when no one celebrates his birthday, he suddenly realizes that his life is too unsatisfactory, and begins to feel anxious. Thus, he desires to be respected and takes the opportunity to change his life. After a series of twists and turns, Kurosawa wins the trust of his younger coworkers, but new problems keep following him one after another, and unexpectedly, he has to go through all sorts of carnage to earn his title of "the strongest."

Characters

Anahira Construction

An unmarried veteran blue-collar worker who has been employed at Anahira Construction for 26 years since graduating high school. Although he is assigned as a site foreman on paper, the reality is that while his colleagues leave the site due to promotion or restructuring, he can not move up, and even so, he can not quit, so he is left alone with a low monthly salary. Since he has no special qualifications and is not well-liked (especially at the beginning of his career), he is sometimes treated coldly, such as being removed from work under the guise of being a traffic control helper. He is also a large man, although his middle-aged weight makes him significantly unattractive to look at. Because of his job, he is proud of his physical strength, and as he admits, he is not very educated or knowledgeable, but is very strong and often uses his wits to overcome a difficult situation. Despite being slightly cowardly, he has the guts to put his own life on the line if his pride is at stake. Generally clumsy in his interpersonal relationships, he tries to break the ice with the people around him or, conversely, tries to get rid of his enemies. In order to achieve this goal, he often engages in outlandish ideas and behaviors, which, coupled with his bad luck, leads to misunderstandings from the people around him, and has even gotten him in trouble with the police. From the middle of the story, he shows his strong personality and is called "a natural monument" and "a dinosaur on the verge of extinction" by Sakaguchi.
In Shin Kurosawa, he has been in a coma for eight years after his last battle, but gradually wakes up and undergoes rehabilitation, slowly recovering from his condition.

Kurosawa's younger coworker thought to be around his 20s, with his words and actions suggesting that he was a former delinquent. Unlike Ono, he has a cool personality and does not show that side of him, but he has a rebellious spirit and does not come to accept people as quickly. At one point in the early part of the story, he disliked Kurosawa partly because of a misunderstanding, but one day, when Kurosawa struggled with his work, he and his colleagues, Asai, Arita, and Nakanishi, formed a friendship with Kurosawa. He is often involved in Kurosawa's schemes, and he is often reluctantly forced to cooperate, but by the end of the story, he rather willingly cooperates with him. He has an older sister who is a stylist. In Shin Kurosawa, he gets married and has a child.

Kurosawa's younger coworker, he is immature in both his looks and personality. His hobby is video games and he likes to sing karaoke of Shōgo Hamada's songs. It is later revealed he was a victim of bullying in the past, and shows a great deal of concern towards Kurosawa when he is attacked by middle schoolers. Along with Sakaguchi, he often watches over Kurosawa.

Kurosawa's younger coworker. He gets along well with Sakaguchi. His zodiac sign is Gemini.

Kurosawa's younger coworker. He gets along well with Sakaguchi. For unexplained reasons, he does not make an appearance for the last battle of the story.

Kurosawa's younger coworker. He has a number of qualifications and is very good at giving precise instructions in actual work. In addition, he voluntarily performs heavy work, and his humble nature, which he does not take pride in, makes him highly popular. He also makes some pretty bold decisions, such as allowing four people to leave early at once. At the beginning of the series, he was Kurosawa's rival, but after Kurosawa's battle scenes became more frequent, his appearances in the series became less so. He is 28 years old and has a beautiful wife and kids.

The president of Anahira Construction, where Kurosawa works. At first glance, he appears to be a mild-mannered old man, but he is also a shrewd veteran manager who gently persuades Kurosawa, who was temporarily isolated at work, to leave the field. But in the second half of the story, every time Kurosawa is detained by the cops, he is often shaken around, including being woken up late at night by a phone call from the police. His hobby is cycling.

One of the workers sent to the Anahira construction site. He tends to follow the rumors about Kurosawa the most. While making a big deal out of his own misunderstandings, he endangers Kurosawa's position by buttering him up with fear, talking behind his back and looking for opportunities to counterattack.

A newbie worker who works with Anahira Construction. In the countryside, he was a proud fighter and delinquent gang leader, and even now he is a headstrong man with a delinquent temperament who is obsessed with being the strongest in the field.

Fujisaki 2nd Middle School

A juvenile delinquent. She and her group of three hooligans first initiate the assault on Kurosawa.

He specializes in boxing. After losing the fight with Kurosawa, he sincerely respects him, calling him "bro" and adoring him. At first glance, he appears to be a complete misfit, but he is actually a returnee who lived in England for three years and speaks English fluently. He also runs a bookie shop, earning 800,000 yen every month, and uses the money to hang out at membership bars and in Hawaii, where he has unfathomable relations with mobsters and wrestlers. He has a distinctive face, and Kurosawa thought he looked "like a Martian," but for some reason he is extremely popular with the girls. Truly a perfect human being, Kurosawa even went so far as to feel inferior to his junior high school counterpart. In the spin-off work Saitsuyo Densetsu Nakane, he appears as a 24-year-old company employee working at Suehiro Bank. He has dyed his hair black and seems to have become quite docile not only in his appearance but also in his friendships, and he strives to gain as many likes on Instagram as possible.

Miscellaneous

A 28-year-old part-time clerk at a video rental store. Fed up with his lazy life, he happens to be present at a diner where Kurosawa organized a rally for a duel with the middle schoolers. He overhears Kurosawa's assertions by chance and is emotionally moved by them, calling Kurosawa "master" and admiring him.

A junior high school student who is not attending school. He is at the diner where Kurosawa decides he is going to duel and is affected by it. He states that he does not know why he is not going to school, but in reality it is due to bullying and blackmail. Encouraged by Kurosawa's fight, he stood up to the delinquents alone and, with the help of Kurosawa and his father, escaped from getting blackmailed. He later appears in Saitsuyo Densetsu Nakane, where he is Nakane's coworker.

One of the homeless people living in a public park. He hates being called homeless and instead prefers "hopeless" or "residentially challenged". Despite claiming to have abandoned all hope, on the other hand, he keeps the suit that he used to wear in order to get a job.

A widowed old woman living with the homeless people. She has lived an unfulfilling life and always laments that she was not instead named "Okane" (which means "money" in Japanese) when she was born.

A lazy son of the director of a major hospital and medical student himself. He uses his financial muscle and illegal drugs to control a biker gang known as Gallon Kids. According to Nakane, he is an atrocious man who commits acts of violence to "make memories," attacks homeless people who sleep in parks, and fleeces them of what little money they have. When Kurosawa happens to be up against biker gang members, he leads an army of about 50 men into a struggle between Kurosawa and a group of homeless people. In Shin Kurosawa, he became the director of his father's hospital and Kurosawa's attending physician.

Shin Kurosawa: Saikyō Densetsu characters

A pair of gay men who are in the same hospital where Kurosawa is. Makio notices Kurosawa's awakening and informs Miki, who then reprimands him for entering someone else's hospital room.

A homeless man Kurosawa meets during his aimless wanders. He is philosophically minded and has a positive outlook.

A shopkeeper Kurosawa meets while procuring food samples in a supermarket, and a former fifth-ranked Japanese lightweight boxer.

An elderly-looking homeless man. Due to his aging face, he has a poor-looking facial expression and has been described as "a man who showed no respect for thirty years" for his misanthropy and refusal to apologize. He loves water, so much so that he makes it a daily routine to procure well water by himself. His eccentric personality is due to his lack of patience since he was young and blaming everyone around him for his failures in life. He has an elderly mother and sister, but they try not to see each other.

Kojiemon's follower. He is aware of his own weakness and has a blatantly servile attitude towards those above him.

One of the homeless people. He has a bald head, but is the same age as Kurosawa. He is a great admirer of Che Guevara and considers himself to be one of Guevara's comrades at the time of the Cuban Revolution.

A quiet young man who is net cafe refugee. He keeps rhinoceros beetles in the ruins of a housing complex, but he does not know how to sell them, so he asks Kurosawa for advice. After selling all the beetles in Kabukicho, he splits the money with Kurosawa and his friends and leaves.

A college girl working at the hostess club "Glittering Girls." She has short brown hair.

A college girl working at the hostess club "Glittering Girls." She has long black hair. She looks exactly like the girl that Kojiemon once had a crush on when working at a restaurant.

A virtuous priest. He goes to Okutama to practice the "Earth Conduction" ritual, but collapses on the way from heat stroke and is saved by Kurosawa. Without knowing why, Kurosawa, who pretended to be him, asks him if he is stupid enough to do such a meaningless thing, and he stops practicing the ritual.

Misaki's father, 49 years old. He is the head of an aikido dojo, and although he accepted a fixed match from the Aiki school at the national aikido tournament, Koinosuke ignores the arrangement and embarrasses him. After the tournament, he went to protest, but was beaten back by students of Aiki school. He asks Kurosawa and his friends to take revenge on him by breaking the fixed game by posing as a shill at a fencing and judo demonstration starring Koinosuke.

An instructor of the aikido school called Aiki. He is 27 years old and immensely popular among mistresses because of his looks. He is prideful and narcissistic, but he is spoiled by his surroundings and is also a novice, so his abilities are almost amateurishly low, with most of his fighting results being due to the matches being fixed. He also performs iaijutsu on stage, which has nothing to do with aikido, where he uses hired applauders each time.

The Aiki school's advisor. At the commemorative fencing and judo demonstration of Koinosuke, the winner of the national aikido championship, he gave a speech full of lies and exaggerations to mistresses (madams) who are ignorant of martial arts and fighting moves. He is a realist and works behind the scenes to protect the resources of the Aiki school.

Koinosuke's grandmother and the founder of the Aiki school of aikido. Although she loves her grandson Koinosuke dearly, she understands the reality that he has no talent for martial arts.

Publication
The Legend of the Strongest, Kurosawa! is written and illustrated by Nobuyuki Fukumoto. It was published in Shogakukan's Big Comic Original from 2002 to 2006 and its chapters were collected in eleven tankōbon volumes, released from June 30, 2003 to November 30, 2006.

A sequel, titled , launched in Big Comic Original on May 20, 2013, to celebrate the 40th anniversary of the magazine. The sequel finished on March 5, 2020. Shogakukan collected its chapters in twenty-one tankōbon volumes, released from November 29, 2013, to November 30, 2020.

A spin-off focused on the main series' secondary character Nakane, written by Kenji Yokoi and illustrated by Motomu Uehara and Kazuya Arai (who also are in charge of the artwork for 1-nichi Gaishutsuroku Hanchō), was published on Shogakukan's Yawaraka Spirits website from December 6, 2017, to February 20, 2020. Two volumes were released on May 30, 2018, and February 28, 2020.

In June 2020, Manga Planet announced the digital English-language publication of the manga. It was planned to start on June 22, 2020, however, it was postponed to November 16, 2020.

Volume list

The Legend of the Strongest, Kurosawa!

Shin Kurosawa: Saikyō Densetsu

Saitsuyo Densetsu Nakane

Reception
The Legend of the Strongest, Kurosawa! was one of the Jury Recommended Works at the 7th Japan Media Arts Festival in 2003.

References

Further reading

External links
 

Comedy anime and manga
Nobuyuki Fukumoto
Seinen manga
Shogakukan franchises
Shogakukan manga